Missie Misomali (born 9 October 1950) is a Malawian sprinter. She competed in the women's 100 metres at the 1972 Summer Olympics.

References

1950 births
Living people
Athletes (track and field) at the 1972 Summer Olympics
Malawian female sprinters
Olympic athletes of Malawi
Place of birth missing (living people)